USS Albatross (SP-1003), a wooden-hulled motor launch built in 1912 by the Adams Shipbuilding Co., East Boothbay, Maine, was acquired by the U.S. Navy and classified as a section patrol craft under a free lease from John R. Rothery of Boston, Massachusetts, for service during World War I.

Service history

World War I East Coast Operations 
Fitted out at the Portsmouth Naval Shipyard in Kittery, Maine,  and commissioned there on 10 August 1917, the vessel was assigned to the 1st Naval District in which she served as a section patrol boat until February 1919.

Post-War Decommissioning 
Following a period in lay-up, she was returned to her owner, John R. Rothery of Boston, Massachusetts, 1 May 1919. Struck from the Navy list, (date unknown). Fate unknown.

References

External links 
 Dictionary of American Naval Fighting Ships
 NavSource Online: Section Patrol Craft Photo Archive - SP-1003 - ex-Albatross (SP 1003)

Ships built in Kittery, Maine
World War I patrol vessels of the United States
Patrol vessels of the United States Navy
1912 ships
Section patrol craft of the United States Navy